West Bridgford is a town and the administrative centre of the Borough of Rushcliffe in the county of Nottinghamshire, England. It lies immediately south of the city of Nottingham, from which the River Trent divides it. Forming part of the Nottingham Urban Area, West Bridgford is a commuter town for the city. The population was estimated at 48,225 in 2018. The town is part of the constituency of Rushcliffe, which is held by Ruth Edwards of the Conservative Party.

History
West Bridgford was founded between 919 and 924 as a set of defences and houses situated at the south end of Trent Bridge. It was established by Edward the Elder, mainly to protect Nottingham and the surrounding area against incursions from Danes in the North of England. A survey during Edward's reign indicates that the population of the settlement at this time was 192 people, 19 of which were farmers.

Most main roads in central West Bridgford are named after wealthy families that dominated its early history. There are also new developments. The roads in the Gamston development have names from the Lake District, and Compton Acres from Dorset and the Purbeck Coast.

At the end of the First World War, the Musters family sold the Trent Bridge Inn and Trent Bridge cricket ground to the county cricket club. The club owned the inn only briefly, then resold it at a profit to a brewery. After pressure, the Musters sold land for building, but strict planning regulations were stipulated for the area then known as the West Bridgford Estate. This was planned over a grid of tree-lined roads. The main roads, such as Musters Road, had restrictions on housing density and size. All houses were specified to contain a certain number of bedrooms. Smaller houses were permitted on side roads and terraces were erected on roads such as Exchange Road for the servants of wealthy Nottingham merchants who had bought West Bridgford property.

The result is a community separate from Nottingham, with no ties of governance to it. In Nottingham, West Bridgford was sometimes dubbed "Bread and Lard Island", implying that its people had spent so much on big houses and fur coats that they could only afford to eat bread and lard. It grew from a small village in the mid-19th century into a town of over 48,000 inhabitants by 2018.

Geography
The northern boundary of West Bridgford is the River Trent. The river is spanned by two road bridges and one pedestrianised bridge allowing access from the town to the city of Nottingham. The bridges link in with safer cycling routes to Nottingham city and railway station, and to the university areas.

Bridges
Trent Bridge has three road lanes in each direction. It is decorated on the sides with carvings visible from the river. In 2017, it was fitted with permanent steel safety barriers at pavement level to protect pedestrians attending major sporting events nearby. Two spans of the original medieval bridge remain, surrounded by a traffic island on the south side of the river, adjacent to Trent Bridge.
Lady Bay Bridge has a single road lane in each direction. It was originally the rail crossing for the Midland Railway's "Melton loop" from London to Nottingham via Melton Mowbray, avoiding Leicester. Despite the line passing on an embankment through the centre of West Bridgford, there was never a West Bridgford station; the nearest station was at Edwalton, which closed in July 1941, as did the line itself in May 1967. Much of the embankment has been removed and the route built over, but part has been converted into a public footpath. Some signs of railway sleepers and ballast can still be seen on the path.
Wilford Suspension Bridge is a cycle and pedestrian bridge to the west of Trent Bridge, linking with The Meadows.
 The planned Waterside Bridge will give cycling and pedestrian access to Trent Basin and Colwick Country Park

Architecture
The central West Bridgford area has a diversity of buildings, mostly Victorian, although larger properties are being demolished for development, as no protection exists for the common housing stock. St. Giles Church is medieval, but heavily restored at the end of the 19th century.

Work has started on constructing 1600 houses at Sharphill and Edwalton/Tollerton triangle.

Neighbourhoods
Abbey Park
Compton Acres
Edwalton 
Gamston 
Lady Bay
Wilford Hill

Nearby places
Source: Google Maps
The Meadows to the north
Holme Pierrepont to the northeast
Tollerton to the southeast
Ruddington to the south
Clifton to the southwest
Wilford to the northwest

Local government
West Bridgford has no town or parish council. It was created as an urban sanitary district in 1891 and became an urban district with an elected council under the Local Government Act 1894. In 1935, the parishes of Edwalton and South Wilford were added to the urban district. This then became part of the larger borough of Rushcliffe under the Local Government Act 1972.

The town holds the headquarters of Nottinghamshire County Council at County Hall, a landmark on the south bank of the River Trent. Nottinghamshire County Council provides the uppermost tier of local government in the area. The town also holds the headquarters of the lower tier Rushcliffe Borough Council at Rushcliffe Arena, a joint headquarters and leisure facility on Rugby Road.

Sport
Nottingham Forest Football Club play at the City Ground on the banks of the River Trent. The club was founded in 1865 and has played at the site since 1898. Between 1975 and 1993, Nottingham Forest was managed by Brian Clough and won a Football League title, two European Cups and four Football League Cups as well as fielding players Trevor Francis, John Robertson, Martin O'Neill, Stuart Pearce and Roy Keane.

At local level, West Bridgford also has a number of football teams for all ages. West Bridgford Colts FC are the largest FA-approved football organisation in the country, running over 90 teams; the club includes West Bridgford Football Club the Senior section for Colts, which started in 2011 on Saturday afternoons in the Nottinghamshire Senior League. Also playing in the Nottinghamshire Senior League are Magdala Amateurs who play at the ROKO Ground.

Trent Bridge Cricket Ground was first used for the purpose in 1838 and held its first Test match in 1899, for England playing against Australia. It is the third oldest ground used as a Test cricket venue after Lord's in London and Eden Gardens in Calcutta, India. Trent Bridge is also home to Nottinghamshire County Cricket Club, a first-class English cricket club.

There are two rowing clubs in West Bridgford – Nottingham Rowing Club and Nottingham and Union Rowing Club – and a rowing shell manufacturer, Raymond Sims Ltd. Several of the town's secondary schools feature rowing activities.

West Bridgford has two major rugby clubs: Nottingham Moderns RFC in Wilford village and West Bridgford Rugby Club. Nottingham RFC moved its training base and reserve team ground from Ireland Road, Beeston, to Lady Bay after the 2005/2006 season. It plays first-team fixtures at Meadow Lane, just over Trent Bridge from West Bridgford.

West Bridgford Hockey Club on Loughborough Road was the childhood hockey club of Olympic Gold medallist and former West Bridgford resident Helen Richardson-Walsh.

Retail
West Bridgford was the location of the UK's first major out-of-town superstore. In 1964, an American company, GEM, opened a store on Loughborough Road. Despite ambitions, GEM's British operations were not a success, with only two other such stores opening. National concessionaires withdrew from these, and in 1966 the fledgling Asda superstore chain, owned by a Leeds, Yorkshire-based dairy farming conglomerate, Associated Dairies, acquired a controlling interest in the GEM operations. The Loughborough Road site still has an Asda store, although it was replaced by a much larger one on land adjacent to the old site in 1999. The original building was demolished and replaced by a car park and petrol station area.

In 2018 Rushcliffe Borough Council appointed a team to recommend improvements and changes to the town. These include better road design, with landscaping points to improve the movement of people from Gordon Road through to Central Avenue. Both roads have independent retailers and national chains. Other proposals include moving Bridgford Road car park underground and putting retail space at ground level.

Education
The West Bridgford School and Rushcliffe School are secondary schools with academy status. The Becket School and The Nottingham Emmanuel School are Catholic and Church of England schools respectively, both in West Bridgford, but operated through Nottingham City Council. The Becket School is fed by primary schools around Nottingham, but only one school in West Bridgford: St Edmund Campion Catholic Primary School. The other feeder schools are Blessed Robert, St Edmund Campion, Our Lady and St Edward's.

The West Bridgford School's feeder primary schools are West Bridgford Infant and Junior School, Jesse Gray Primary School, Heymann Primary School and Greythorn Primary School. Rushcliffe School's feeder primary schools are Abbey Road Primary School, Pierpont Gamston Primary School, Edwalton Primary School, Lady Bay Primary School and St Peter's School in Ruddington.

Local facilities
Rushcliffe Arena, extended in 2017 with a swimming pool, a gym and now the offices of Rushcliffe Borough Council
West Bridgford Young People's Centre, adjacent to the library, with a music studio, dance studio and other facilities
West Bridgford Library
Bridgford Park
The Studio Theatre, home of West Bridgford Dramatic Society, the only registered public theatre in Rushcliffe Borough
Lutterell Hall, a managed community facility in the centre of West Bridgford. Owned by the Borough Council and managed by The Rock Church. Gifted to the people of West Bridgford by the adjacent church.
Sir Julien Cahn Pavilion, a managed community facility on Loughborough Road, West Bridgford. Owned and managed by Rushcliffe Borough Council.

Media

Newspapers
Nottingham & Long Eaton Topper was established in 1994.

Public transport

Railways
Nottingham station is directly northwest of the town across the River Trent. It is the nearest railway station to the town.

The former Manton Route from Nottingham to Melton Mowbray ran to the east of the town although no station was ever built to serve the town. Instead there was a station at Edwalton but it closed to passengers in 1944 with the through line to Nottingham not long after. Only a stub remains in use south of the old station site to Melton Mowbray as a test track. The site of Edwalton station has since been redeveloped for housing.

There was also a station in Ruddington on the Great Central Main Line between Loughborough Central and Nottingham Victoria. But this closed in 1969 and since been left unused.

Bus services
Nottingham City Transport
1: Nottingham → Nottingham Station → Trent Bridge → West Bridgford (Wilford Lane) → NTU Clifton Campus → Clifton → Gotham → East Leake → Loughborough
1A: Nottingham → Nottingham Station → Trent Bridge → West Bridgford (Wilford Lane) → NTU Clifton Campus → Clifton
1B: Nottingham → Nottingham Station → Trent Bridge → West Bridgford (Wilford Lane) → NTU Clifton Campus → Clifton
3: Nottingham → Nottingham Station → West Bridgford (Wilford Lane) → Ruddington → Clifton (Farnborough Road, Southchurch Drive, Hartness Road)
4: NTU City Campus → Nottingham Station → Trent Bridge → West Bridgford (Wilford Lane) → NTU Clifton Campus
5: Nottingham → Nottingham Station → Trent Bridge → West Bridgford (Central Avenue) → Melton Road → Gamston
6: Nottingham → Nottingham Station]] → Trent Bridge → West Bridgford (Central Avenue) → Edwalton
7: Nottingham → Nottingham Station → Trent Bridge → West Bridgford (Central Avenue) → Abbey Park → Gamston
7B: Gamston → Abbey Park → West Bridgford (Central Avenue) → Trent Bridge
8: Nottingham → Nottingham Station → Trent Bridge → West Bridgford (Central Avenue) → Wilford Hill → Compton Acres
9: Nottingham → Nottingham Station → Trent Bridge → West Bridgford (Central Avenue) → Compton Acres → Wilford Hill
9B: Nottingham → Nottingham Station → Trent Bridge → West Bridgford (Central Avenue) → Compton Acres → Wilford Hill
10: Nottingham → Nottingham Station → Trent Bridge → West Bridgford (Loughborough Road) → Wilford Hill → Ruddington
10C: Nottingham → Nottingham Station → Trent Bridge → West Bridgford (Loughborough Road) → Wilford Hill → Ruddington → Rushcliffe Country Park
10X: Nottingham → Nottingham Station → Trent Bridge → West Bridgford (Loughborough Road) → Wilford Hill → Ruddington (Business Park)
11: Nottingham → Nottingham Station → Meadows → Trent Bridge → West Bridgford (Radcliffe Road) → Lady Bay
11C: Nottingham → Nottingham Station → The Meadows → Trent Bridge → West Bridgford (Radcliffe Road) → Lady Bay → Water Sports Centre
N4: NTU City Campus → Nottingham → Nottingham Station → Trent Bridge → West Bridgford (Wilford Lane) → NTU Clifton Campus
N6: Nottingham → Nottingham Station → Trent Bridge → West Bridgford (Central Avenue) → Wilford Hill → Compton Acres → Loughborough Road

Trentbarton
The Cotgrave: Nottingham → West Bridgford → Cotgrave
The Keyworth: Nottingham → West Bridgford (Melton Road) → Keyworth
Mainline: Nottingham → West Bridgford → Radcliffe → Bingham
Rushcliffe Villager: Nottingham → West Bridgford → Radcliffe → Shelford → Gunthorpe → East Bridgford → Newton → Bingham

Nottingham Community Transport
L1: Nottingham → Nottingham Station → Trent Bridge → West Bridgford (Wilford Lane) → Wilford Village → Silverdale → Clifton
L22: Gamston → West Bridgford → Ruddington → Clifton
L23: Gamston → Clifton → Ruddington → West Bridgford

Kinchbus
9: Nottingham → Trent Bridge → West Bridgford (Loughborough Road) → Ruddington → Bradmore → Bunny → Costock → Rempstone → Hoton → Cotes → Loughborough

Centrebus
19: Nottingham → West Bridgford (Melton Road) → Tollerton → Stanton-on-the-Wolds → Nether Broughton → Melton Mowbray

Marshalls
90: Nottingham → Trent Bridge → West Bridgford (Radcliffe Road) → Radcliffe → Farndon → Newark
90A: Nottingham → Trent Bridge → West Bridgford (Radcliffe Road) → Radcliffe → Farndon → Newark → Balderton

Nottsbus Connect
822: Nottingham → West Bridgford (Central Avenue) → Gamston → Tollerton → Cotgrave → Cropwell Bishop → Langar → Barnstone → Granby → Elton on the Hill → Orston → Aslockton → Bingham

West Bridgford UDC's own fleet of buses with brown-and-yellow livery merged with Nottingham City Transport in 1968.

Notable residents
Ellie Brazil (born 1999), England under 21 and Tottenham Hotspur L.F.C. association footballer, was born in the town.
Kenneth Clarke  (born 1940), former Member of Parliament, was born in and lives in West Bridgford, represented the town as the Rushcliffe constituency MP from 1970 to 2019, and was Father of the House in his last two years in the Commons.
John Crocker (born 1937), leading clarinet and saxophone player for the Chris Barber jazz band for just over 30 years, was born in West Bridgford.
Leslie Crowther (1933–1996), comedian, actor and TV presenter, was born in West Bridgford.
Helen Richardson-Walsh (born 1981), hockey Olympic Gold medallist, grew up in West Bridgford.
Harry Wheatcroft (1898–1977), rose grower, lived in West Bridgford.
The blogger and comedy musician LadBaby (real name Mark Hoyle, born 1987), grew up in West Bridgford.

References

External links

Rushcliffe Borough Council
West Bridgford has had its own news website, West Bridgford Wire, since 2012.
Schools:
Rushcliffe School
The West Bridgford School
The Becket School
The Nottingham Emmanuel School

 
Towns in Nottinghamshire
Unparished areas in Nottinghamshire
Rushcliffe